The literature that makes up the ancient Egyptian funerary texts is a collection of religious documents that were used in ancient Egypt, usually to help the spirit of the concerned person to be preserved in the afterlife.

They evolved over time, beginning with the Pyramid Texts in the Old Kingdom through the Coffin Texts of the Middle Kingdom and into several books, most famously the Book of the Dead, in the New Kingdom and later times.

Old Kingdom

The funerary texts of the Old Kingdom were initially reserved for the king only. Towards the end of the period, the texts appeared in the tombs of royal wives.

Middle Kingdom

These are a collection of ancient Egyptian funerary spells written on coffins beginning in the First Intermediate Period. Nearly half of the spells in the Coffin Texts derive from those in the Pyramid Texts.

New Kingdom
Book of the Dead
Amduat
Spell of the Twelve Caves
The Book of Gates
Book of the Netherworld
Book of Caverns
Book of the Earth
Litany of Re

Late New Kingdom
Books of the Sky
After the Amarna Period, a new set of funerary texts began to be used. These centre on representations of Nut (goddess), the sky goddess. They represent the nighttime journey of the sun into and through her body, with her giving birth to the rejuvenated sun in the morning. From the tomb of Ramesses IV onwards two of these Books of the Sky were usually placed next to each other on the ceiling of royal tombs.

 Book of Nut
 Book of the Day
 Book of the Night
 Book of the Heavenly Cow

Late Period
Books of Breathing

Ptolemaic
Book of Traversing Eternity

References

Further reading

 
 
 

 

ko:사후세계의 서